The 2007 Speedway World Cup Final was the fourth and last race of the 2007 Speedway World Cup season. It took place on July 21, 2007 in the Alfred Smoczyk Stadium in Leszno, Poland.

Results

Heat details

Heat after heat 
 Kasprzak, Andersen, Sullivan, Richardsson
 Hampel, Crump, Bjerre, Stead
 Gollob, Iversen, Holder, Kennett
 Holta, N.Pedersen, Adams, Harris
 Watt, B.Pedersen, Nicholls, Walasek
 N.Pedersen, Holder, Richardsson, Walasek
 Kasprzak, Adams, B.Pedersen, Stead
 Hampel, Andersen, Watt, Kennett
 Gollob, Bjerre, Sullivan, Harris
 Iversen, Holta, Nicholls, Crump(joker)-t
 Hampel, Iversen, Adams, Richardsson-e3
 Gollob, N.Pedersen, Stead, Watt
 B.Pedersen, Holta, Sullivan, Kennett
 Crump, Andersen, Harris, Baliński-Fx
 Bjerre, Kasprzak, Nicholls, Holder
 Crump, B.Pedersen, Richardsson, Gollob
 Andersen, Holta, Nicholls(joker), Schlein
 Bjerre, Baliński, Adams, Allen
 Kasprzak, Harris, Iversen, Watt
 N.Pedersen, Hampel, Sullivan, Nicholls
 Holta, Richardsson, Bjerre, Watt
 Sullivan, Baliński, Iversen, Stead
 Kasprzak, N.Pedersen, Crump, Allen-e4
 B.Pedersen, Hampel, Schlein, Harris
 Gollob, Nicholls, Andersen, Adams

References

See also 
 2007 Speedway World Cup
 motorcycle speedway

!